Rithal is a village in Rohtak district of Haryana, India. It is located 22 km from Rohtak. Initially it was a part of Sonipat district, however for a long time it has been in the Rohtak District. This is one of the very few villages which has two panchayats (Rithal Phogat and Rithal Narwal). Villagers work in various fields such as agriculture, armed forces, information technology, banking, business and in various government departments.

Gallery

References

External links
 Rithal.com

Villages in Rohtak district